Eotetrapodiformes is a clade of tetrapodomorphs including the four-limbed vertebrates ("tetrapods" in the traditional sense) and their closest finned relatives, two groups of stem tetrapods called tristichopterids and elpistostegalids. The clade was named in 2010 by Michael I. Coates and Matt Friedman, and is defined as "the node-based
clade arising from the most recent common ancestor of Eusthenopteron and Ichthyostega plus all of its descendants". It thus excludes the basalmost tetrapodomorphs, such as the rhizodonts and megalichthyiforms.

Cladogram from Swartz, 2012:

References 

 
Extant Devonian first appearances
Evolution of tetrapods